This Land may refer to:
 This Land (TV series), a Canadian TV series
 This Land (Bill Frisell album), 1994
 This Land (Gary Clark Jr. album), 2019
 This Land (song), the title track of the Gary Clark Jr. album
 This Land (podcast)
 "This Land", an instrumental by Hans Zimmer on The Lion King: Original Motion Picture Soundtrack
 This Land, a magazine published by This Land Press

See also
This Land Is Mine (disambiguation)
 "This Land Is Your Land", a 1944 American folk song by Woody Guthrie